The 30th NEC Cup began on 3 June 2010 and concluded on 5 March 2011. Defending champion Kono Rin and Honinbo Yamashita Keigo were given first-round byes. Cho U defeated Keigo in the final, winning his third NEC Cup.

Tournament

References

Go competitions in Japan
2010 in go
2011 in go